The Ministry of Education and Science of Armenia is the Armenian state body of executive authority, which elaborates and implements the policies set out by the Government of Armenia in the education and science sectors.

See also 

 Education in Armenia
 Science and technology in Armenia

References

External links 
 Official website
 Ministry of Education and Science on Facebook

Government ministries of Armenia
Education ministries
Science and technology ministries
Science and technology in Armenia